Elco van der Geest (born 4 May 1979 in Haarlem, North Holland) is a Dutch-born Belgian judoka. Throughout his career, Elco had competed for the Netherlands. In August 2009, Elco accepted the request to join the Belgian team. He achieved Belgian citizenship right before the 2009 World Judo Championships in Rotterdam.

He is the son of coach Cor van der Geest and a younger brother of Dennis who is also a judoka competing on the highest level.

According to International Judo Federation's World Ranking List, as of June 2010, Elco van der Geest is rank at the number-two spot under Takamasa Anai of Japan.

He has twice competed at the Olympics, once for the Netherlands in 2004 losing to Ihar Makarau in the semi-finals, and then to Ariel Zeevi in the bronze medal match, and then in 2012 where he lost to eventual gold medalist Tagir Khaibulaev in the first round.

Achievements

References

External links
 
 

 Videos of Elco van der Geest (judovision.org)
 Dutch Olympic Committee

1979 births
Living people
Dutch male judoka
van der Geest
Judoka at the 2004 Summer Olympics
Judoka at the 2012 Summer Olympics
van der Geest
Olympic judoka of the Netherlands
Sportspeople from Haarlem